The Military Opposition was a group of delegates to the VIII Congress of the RCP (b), held from March 18 to March 23, 1919, who advocated the preservation of partisan methods of commanding the army and waging war, against building a regular army, attracting "bourgeois" military specialists, which was being entertained at the time by the Red Army military commanders. Part of the active figures of the Military Opposition actually opposed the construction of a regular army altogether.

The military opposition itself was not a cohesive faction. Its participants argued among themselves on many issues, some of them accepted the theses of the military opposition only partially, continuing to support Lenin on other issues.

References

Factions in the Communist Party of the Soviet Union
Organizations of the Russian Revolution
Russian Civil War
1918 establishments in Russia